Biegler is a surname. Notable people with the surname include:

Franz Biegler (1894–?), Austrian footballer
George W. Biegler (1869–1929), United States Army captain
Michael Biegler (born 1961), German handball coach
Steven Biegler (born 1959), American priest